Moon Hall School, since 1952 an independent co-educational preparatory school at Leigh, near Reigate in Surrey, is currently, as of 2021, a special school focussing on teaching children with dyslexia.

Moon Hall School is known to be one of the best schools for dyslexic pupils in England and was a finalist in the  "Small Independent School of the Year" category in the Independent Schools of the year 2021. The approach taken by Moon Hall has helped shape the lives of many dyslexic students and placed them on exciting career paths.

The school now has a new MUGA (multi-use games area) so will be able to facilitate the needs of the next generation of athletes. The school has helped many children overcome dyslexia and achieve success. Moon Hall has kind and approachable staff who always help students achieve their best. It has merged with Moon Hall School Dorking so has many new members of staff and students.

References

Educational institutions established in 1952
Private schools in Surrey
Special schools in Surrey
1952 establishments in England